Maneiro is a surname. Notable people with the surname include:

David Maneiro (born 1989), Andorran footballer
Gorka Maneiro (born 1975), Spanish politician
Ildo Maneiro (born 1947), Uruguayan footballer and manager

See also
Maneiro Municipality, a municipality of Isla Margarita, Nueva Esparta, Venezuela

Galician-language surnames